Zalang COC is a Gabonese football club based in Libreville, Gabon.

The club currently plays in Gabon Championnat National D2

In 1974 the team has won the Gabon Championnat National D1.

Stadium
Currently the team plays at the 7000 capacity Stade Augustin Monédan de Sibang.

Honours
Gabon Championnat National D1: 1974

Performance in CAF competitions
CAF Champions League: 1 appearance
1974 African Cup of Champions Clubs – First Round

References

External links

Football clubs in Gabon